Betioky is a town in Atsimo-Andrefana Region, Madagascar and is crossed by the Route nationale 10. 
An airport serves the town.

Betioky belongs to the poorest regions of Madagascar, where no facilities for tapped drinking water exist.

Communes
The district is further divided into 20 communes:
 Ambatry Mitsinjo
 Andranomangatsiaka
 Antohabato
 Beantake
 Beavoha
 Belamoty
 Betioky
 Bezaha
 Fenoandala
 Lazarivo
 Manalobe
 Masiaboay
 Montifeno
 Salobe
 Soamanonga
 Soaserana
 Tameantsoa
 Tanambao Ambony
 Tongobory
 Vatolatsaka

Nature
The Beza Mahafaly Reserve lies approx. 35 km North-East of Betioky Sud.

Religion
EEM - Eklesia Episkopaly Malagasy (Anglican Church of Madagascar)

References

Districts of Atsimo-Andrefana